Leona M. Marlin-Romeo (born 3 July 1973)  is a Sint Maarten politician who served as Prime Minister of Sint Maarten from 2018 to 2019. She previously served as a Member of Parliament from 2014 to 2016.



Early life
Leona Marlin-Romeo was born on 3 July 1973 on Sint Maarten to Marius Romeo and Marilyn Thomas. As a child Marlin-Romeo attended the Methodist Agogic Center (MAC) in Sint Maarten. She briefly attended St. Maarten Academy before transferring to Oak Hill Academy in Virginia. She graduated from Adelphi University in 1995 with a bachelor's degree in political science and a minor in French. She continued her education at the University of Amsterdam where she graduated with a master's degree in International Relations. In 2005, Marlin-Romeo returned to Sint Maarten, and began working as the Head of the Civil Registry Department.

Personal life
Marlin-Romeo has been married to Richard Marlin since 1997, the couple have  two children.

References

See also
 List of Sint Maarten leaders of government

1973 births
Living people
Women prime ministers
Sint Maarten women in politics
Prime Ministers of Sint Maarten
United St. Maarten Party politicians
National Alliance (Sint Maarten) politicians
United People's Party (Sint Maarten) politicians
University of Amsterdam alumni
Adelphi University alumni
21st-century Dutch women politicians
21st-century Dutch politicians
Women heads of government of non-sovereign entities